The Women's 200m Backstroke event at the 2003 Pan American Games took place on August 17, 2003 (Day 16 of the Games).

Medalists

Records

Results

Notes

References
2003 Pan American Games Results: Day 16, CBC online; retrieved 2009-06-13.
usaswimming
SwimNews Results

Backstroke, Women's 200m
2003 in women's swimming
Swim